Kristian Frisch (8 July 1891 – 7 December 1954) was a Danish cyclist. He competed in two events at the 1920 Summer Olympics.

References

External links
 

1891 births
1954 deaths
Danish male cyclists
Olympic cyclists of Denmark
Cyclists at the 1920 Summer Olympics
Cyclists from Copenhagen